Ronald McDonald Swan (born 8 January 1941) is a Scottish footballer who played as a goalkeeper in the Football League. He was born in Plean.

See also
Football in Scotland
List of football clubs in Scotland

References

External links

1941 births
Living people
Scottish footballers
Association football goalkeepers
East Stirlingshire F.C. players
Oldham Athletic A.F.C. players
Luton Town F.C. players
Altrincham F.C. players
English Football League players
Camelon Juniors F.C. players
Footballers from Stirling (council area)